Mungo Mason (born 4 October 1995) is a Scottish professional rugby union player who plays as a flanker (back row) for Old Glory DC in Major League Rugby (MLR). He previously played for the San Diego Legion in the MLR and Edinburgh in the Pro14.

Early life
Born in Carluke, Scotland. His mother is Helen Mason a Senior Executive Director Commissioning at Department of Health & Human Services, Victoria. Mason was raised in New Zealand having moved to Tauranga aged 2 and lived in New Zealand until 2017 when Mungo moved to the United States to further his studies at Chicago-Kent College of Law upon the completion to his LLB degree at the University of Waikato through Sir Edmund Hillary scholarship.

Professional career
While at Waikato, he was signed to play in the fledgling Major League Rugby competition in 2018 for San Diego Legion before moving to Scotland where Mason was selected to play for Scotland in the 2018-19 World Rugby Sevens Series. He joined Old Glory DC in 2020, where he was a co-captain of the team wearing the number 7. After the 2021 season, he left to attend the University of Oxford for a Master of Sustainability, Enterprise and the Environment at St Cross College.

References

External links
 Mungo Mason Player Statistics

1995 births
Living people
Scottish rugby union players
Rugby union flankers
Rugby union number eights
Scotland international rugby sevens players
Edinburgh Rugby players
Old Glory DC players
San Diego Legion players
Rugby union players from South Lanarkshire
Zimbabwean rugby union players
Zimbabwe Goshawks players